Lower Merion Township is a township in Montgomery County, Pennsylvania. It is part of the Philadelphia Main Line. The township's name originates with the county of Merioneth in north Wales. Merioneth is an English-language transcription of the Welsh Meirionnydd.

Lower Merion is one of the major inner ring suburbs of Philadelphia, along with Upper Darby, Haverford, and Cheltenham. With a population of 63,633, Lower Merion Township is the ninth most populous city, town or borough in Pennsylvania as of the 2020 U.S. census.

History

Lower Merion Township was first settled in 1682 by Welsh Quakers, who were granted a tract of land, the Welsh Tract, by William Penn. In 1713, Lower Merion was established as an independent Township with about 52 landholders and tenants. In 1900, the Township was incorporated as a Township of the First Class.  Lower Merion is home to the oldest continuously used place of worship in the United States, the Merion Friends Meeting House, used continuously since 1695.

On April 4, 1991, U.S. Senator John Heinz died while as a passenger in a Piper Aerostar propeller aircraft when it collided with a Bell 412 helicopter over the Merion Elementary School in the Merion air disaster.  The other four people in both aircraft also died, and the falling debris from the aircraft also caused the death of two elementary students and injured five others.

The Mill Creek Historic District, and Seville Theatre are listed on the National Register of Historic Places. Green Hill Farms was added in 2011.

In 2010, the township received national media attention when a student filed a lawsuit, Robbins v. Lower Merion School District, after a school administrator used the webcam of a school-issued laptop to spy on the student while the student was in his home. The Electronic Frontier Foundation (EFF) and the American Civil Liberties Union (ACLU) filed an amicus brief in support of the student.

In 2012, the Federal Highway Administration modified the Manual on Uniform Traffic Control Devices in a way that would have required the replacement of Lower Merion's historic street signs, some of which date back to the early 1910s. After some campaigning by local residents and by Senator Pat Toomey, the Lower Merion Board of Commissioners declared, via an ordinance, the entire Lower Merion as a historic district and received a waiver from Secretary of Transportation Ray LaHood.

Geography
According to the U.S. Census Bureau, the township has a total area of 23.9 square miles (61.8 km2), of which 23.7 square miles (61.4 km2)  is land and 0.2 square mile (0.4 km2)  (0.67%) is water.

The township is bounded by the Wynnefield Heights, Belmont Village, Wynnefield, and Overbrook communities in the city of Philadelphia; the Boroughs of Conshohocken and West Conshohocken, and the Townships of Upper Merion and Whitemarsh in Montgomery County and by the Townships of Haverford and Radnor in Delaware County. The Borough of Narberth, a separate political entity of one-half square mile, is completely surrounded by the Township.

Forming the township's southern border is City Avenue separating it from the City of Philadelphia. Along City Ave, starting with the Schuylkill Expressway and continuing on to Lord & Taylor at Belmont Avenue in Bala Cynwyd, is what is known as the "Golden Mile" which also includes the radio and television studios of WCAU, the Exxon Building, the Fox Building and the Germantown Savings Bank Building. Behind those buildings are the One-Ninety-One Condominiums and the Bala Cynwyd Plazas.

The township's eastern border is along the Schuylkill River.

Before European settlement, Lower Merion's dense forest was home to bears, cougars, wolves, rattlesnakes, otters, beavers, weasels, turkeys, grouses, woodland bison, trout, and bald eagles.  When Europeans arrived, they began cutting down the forests, chasing away much of the wildlife.  After World War II, Lower Merion transformed from a farming township to a suburban area, and wildlife changed accordingly.  Today, red foxes, white-footed mice, horned owls, skunks, raccoons, crayfish, songbirds, butterflies, and white-tailed deer populate the township.

Unincorporated communities
Ardmore (also in Delaware County)
Bala Cynwyd
Belmont Hills
Bryn Mawr (also in Delaware County)
Gladwyne
Haverford (also in Delaware County)
Merion
Overbrook Hills
Pencoyd
Penn Valley
Penn Wynne
Roseglen
Rosemont (also in Delaware County)
Villanova (also in Delaware County)
Wynnewood

Climate
Lower Merion straddles the boundary between a hot-summer humid continental climate (Dfa) and a humid subtropical climate (Cfa). The hardiness zone is 7a. Average monthly temperatures in Gladwyne range from 31.7 °F in January to 76.5 °F in July, in Bryn Mawr they range from 31.4 °F in January to 76.4 °F in July, and at the former location of NBC 10 studios in Bala Cynwyd they range from 32.6 °F in January to 77.4 °F in July.

Demographics

As of the 2010 census, the township was 85.7% White, 5.6% Black or African American, 0.1% Native American, 6.0% Asian, and 1.9% were two or more races. 3.0% of the population were of Hispanic or Latino ancestry.

As of the census of 2000, there were 59,850 people, 22,868 households, and 15,024 families residing in the township.  The population density was 2,526.1 people per square mile (975.4/km2).  There were 23,699 housing units at an average density of 1,000.3/sq mi (386.2/km2).  The racial makeup of the township was 90.30% White, 4.50% African American, 0.08% Native American, 3.42% Asian, 0.07% Pacific Islander, 0.50% from other races and 1.12% from two or more races. Hispanic or Latino of any race were 1.60% of the population.

There were 22,868 households, out of which 29.4% had children under the age of 18 living with them, 56.7% were married couples living together, 7.0% had a female householder with no husband present, and 34.3% were non-families. 28.3% of all households were made up of individuals, and 12.4% had someone living alone who was 65 years of age or older.  The average household size was 2.42 and the average family size was 2.99.

In the township, the population was spread out, with 21.7% under the age of 18, 10.7% from 18 to 24, 23.0% from 25 to 44, 26.2% from 45 to 64 and 18.5% who were 65 years of age or older.  The median age was 41 years. For every 100 females, there were 83.5 males.  For every 100 women aged 18 and over, there were 78.7 males.

The median income for a household in the township was $86,373, and the median income for a family was $115,694 (these figures had risen to $114,608 and $148,123 respectively as of a 2007 estimate). Men had a median income of $77,692 versus $43,793 for women. The per capita income for the township was $55,526.  About 1.9% of families and 4.5% of the population were below the poverty line, including 2.8% of those under age 18 and 5.6% of those age 65 or over.

Government and politics

Lower Merion is a first-class township with 14 commissioners elected by ward.
Daniel Bernheim (D), Ward 1
Joshua Grimes (D), Ward 2
Michael F. McKeon (D), Ward 3
Anthony C. Stevenson (D), Ward 4
Ray A. Courtney (D), Ward 5
Andrew S. Gavrin (D), Ward 6
Sean P. Whalen (D), Ward 7
Shawn Kraemer (D), Ward 8
David F. McComb (D), Ward 9
V. Scott Zelov (R), Ward 10
Tiffany O'Neill (R), Ward 11
Todd M. Sinai (D), Ward 12, President
Gilda L. Kramer (D), Ward 13
Rick Churchill (D), Ward 14

The Township is part of the Fourth Congressional District (represented by Rep. Madeleine Dean), the Fifth Congressional District (represented by Rep. Mary Gay Scanlon), the 149th State House District (represented by Rep. Tim Briggs), the 148th State House District (represented by Rep. Mary Jo Daley), the 194th State House District (represented by Rep. Pam DeLissio) and the 17th State Senate District (represented by Sen. Amanda Cappelletti).

Transportation

Roads and highways

Several major highways traverse Lower Merion Township, including the Schuylkill Expressway (Interstate 76), "Blue Route" (Interstate 476), U.S. Route 1, U.S. Route 30, Pennsylvania Route 320 and Pennsylvania Route 23. The Schuylkill Expressway follows a northwest-southeast route along the northeastern border of the township, adjacent to its namesake river, while I-476 and PA 320 both clip the far northwest corner of the township. US 1 follows City Avenue along the southeastern border of the township, while US 30 follows Lancaster Avenue across southern portions of the township. Finally, PA 23 follows Conshohocken State Road through the heart of Lower Merion.

Public transportation

Lower Merion Township is the heart of the affluent Philadelphia Main Line series of suburban communities, named after the "Main Line" of the former Pennsylvania Railroad that runs through the township.  Now known as SEPTA Regional Rail's Paoli/Thorndale Line, the rail line has station stops in Lower Merion in the following communities within the township:
 Merion Station in Merion
 Wynnewood Station in Wynnewood
 Ardmore Station in Ardmore (also served by Amtrak's Keystone Service)
 Haverford Station in Haverford
 Bryn Mawr Station in Bryn Mawr
 Rosemont Station in Rosemont

SEPTA Regional Rail's Cynwyd Line, with weekday service, has stops at:
 Bala Station
 Cynwyd Station (both in Bala Cynwyd)

SEPTA operates the Norristown High Speed Line between Norristown Transportation Center and 69th Street Transportation Center through the western part of Lower Merion Township with stops located at Matsonford and County Line, with additional stops located just outside the township in Delaware County.

Economy

Top employers
According to a Lower Merion Township bond document, the top employers in 2015 were:

Education

Primary and secondary schools

Public schools

Pupils living in the Lower Merion Township attend schools in the Lower Merion School District unless they go to a private school.  The educational roots of the township stretch back to the Lower Merion Academy, one of the first public schools in the country.

There are six elementary schools, three middle schools, and two high schools (Lower Merion and Harriton High Schools). Students are split between schools depending on location of residence.

Notable graduates
Basketball star Kobe Bryant attended Lower Merion High School. He led the Aces to the state championship in 1996. Producer Marshall Herskovitz was also once a student at Lower Merion High School. Author Lisa Scottoline graduated from Lower Merion High School. Ronald Reagan's first secretary of state, Alexander Haig, graduated from Lower Merion High School, as did Robert Fagles. Lawrence Summers, the former president of Harvard University and the 71st Secretary of the Treasury, graduated from Harriton High School.

Actor David Boreanaz attended Rosemont School of the Holy Child in the Rosemont section of Lower Merion Township. His father, Dave Roberts, is a weatherman for WPVI-TV's Action News in Philadelphia, Pennsylvania.

Private schools
Rosemont School of the Holy Child, located in Rosemont and in Lower Merion Township, is affiliated with but not governed by the Roman Catholic Archdiocese of Philadelphia. The school is adjacent to Rosemont College.

Other private schools in the area include The Shipley School, The Baldwin School, Waldron Mercy Academy, The Haverford School, The Agnes Irwin School, Friends Central School, French International School of Philadelphia, Kohelet Yeshiva High School, The Mesivta High School, Caskey Torah Academy, and other schools outside the area.

Colleges and universities

Bryn Mawr College, Harcum College, Rosemont College, and St. Charles Borromeo Seminary are located in Lower Merion Township. The campus of Saint Joseph's University straddles the city line between Lower Merion and Philadelphia, while Haverford College straddles the lines between Lower Merion and Haverford Townships.

Miscellaneous education
The Japanese Language School of Philadelphia (JLSP, フィラデルフィア日本語補習授業校 Firaderufia Nihongo Hoshū Jugyō Kō), a supplementary Japanese school, holds its classes at the Friends Central School (FCS) in Wynnewood and in Lower Merion Township. Residents are also serviced by the Lower Merion Library System.

Historic features

NRHP Historic Districts
Bryn Mawr College Historic District
Gladwyne Historic District
Mill Creek Historic District

Notable buildings and structures
1690 House (1690), part of Mill Creek Historic District
Arboretum of the Barnes Foundation (1922)
The Baldwin School (1890–91), NRHP listed
Black Rock Dam (1825)
Bryn Mawr Hospital (1893)
Bryn Mawr Theater (1926), NRHP listed
Dolobran (1881)
Flat Rock Tunnel (1838–40)
Green Hill Farms (1695), NRHP listed
Harriton House (1704), NRHP listed
Idlewild Farm Complex (1740), NRHP listed
Lankenau Medical Center (1953)
Lower Merion Academy (1812), NRHP listed
Manayunk Bridge (1918)
Merion Cricket Club (1897), NRHP listed
Merion Friends Meeting House (1714), NRHP listed
Merion Tribute House (1924)
Pencoyd (c.1690, demolished 1964)
Philadelphia Country Club (1890)
Rathalla, Rosemont College (1889–91), NRHP listed
St. Charles Borromeo Seminary (1871)
Suburban Square (1928)
M. Carey Thomas Library (1901–07), NRHP listed
General Wayne Inn (1704), NRHP listed
West Laurel Hill Cemetery (1869), NRHP listed
Whitehall Apartments (1925–26), NRHP listed
Woodmont (1891–94), NRHP listed
Yorklynne (1899-1902, demolished 1974), former campus of Episcopal Academy, removed from NRHP 1974

Notable people
Walter Annenberg, newspaper tycoon/philanthropist
Hap Arnold, WWII Air Force general
Albert C. Barnes
James Hadley Billington, Librarian of Congress
Kobe Bryant, basketball legend, five-time NBA champion with the Los Angeles Lakers
Taylor Buchholz, baseball player
John Debella, DJ
Shelly Gross, film producer
Alexander Haig, Secretary of State
Patti LaBelle, Grammy award-winning singer
 Howard Lassoff, American-Israeli basketball player
Jeffrey Lurie, producer, businessman and owner of NFL's Philadelphia Eagles
Garry Maddox, baseball player
Brooke McCarter, actor, singer, director, producer star of the film The Lost Boys
Tim McCarver, major league catcher and baseball broadcaster
David Magerman, philanthropist
Teddy Pendergrass, Grammy winning singer
M. Night Shyamalan, filmmaker
Martin J. Silverstein, attorney and diplomat who served as United States Ambassador 
Lawrence Summers, former Harvard president

See also 

 Radnor Township
 Tredyffrin Township
 Easttown Township
 Haverford Township
 Whitemarsh Township
 Borough of Conshohocken
 Upper Merion Township
 Philadelphia

References

External links

 Lower Merion Township
 Lower Merion Historical Society
 Lower Merion School District

 
1713 establishments in Pennsylvania
Philadelphia Main Line
Townships in Montgomery County, Pennsylvania
Townships in Pennsylvania